Wu Xiaoxuan (Chinese: 吴小旋; Pinyin: Wú Xiǎoxuán;  born 26 January 1958 in Hangzhou, Zhejiang) is a female Chinese sports shooter who competed in the 1984 Summer Olympics, where she won the gold medal in the women's standard small-bore rifle 3x20 competition. Wu is the first Chinese female athlete to win an Olympic gold medal.

After her retirement, Wu worked as Director of physical culture in Hangzhou, and then moved to the United States in 1991, studying at University of Southern California. She now lives a low-profile life in the United States, working in a hat factory.

References

External links
Wu Xiaoxuan at China Daily

1958 births
Living people
Chinese female sport shooters
Chinese expatriate sportspeople in the United States
ISSF rifle shooters
Olympic shooters of China
Shooters at the 1984 Summer Olympics
Olympic gold medalists for China
Olympic medalists in shooting
Sportspeople from Hangzhou
Asian Games medalists in shooting
Shooters at the 1982 Asian Games

Medalists at the 1984 Summer Olympics
Olympic bronze medalists for China
Asian Games gold medalists for China
Medalists at the 1982 Asian Games
Sport shooters from Zhejiang